Sergei Valeryevich Pravosud (born 18 February 1986) is a former Russian professional football player.

Club career
He made his debut in the Russian Premier League in 2005 for PFC CSKA Moscow.

Honours
 Russian Premier League champion: 2005.
 Russian Cup winner: 2006 (played in the early stages of the 2005/06 tournament for CSKA).

References

1986 births
People from Novhorod-Siverskyi
Living people
Russian footballers
PFC CSKA Moscow players
FC Shinnik Yaroslavl players
FC Sibir Novosibirsk players
Russian Premier League players
FC Sodovik Sterlitamak players
FC SKA-Khabarovsk players
Association football forwards
Association football midfielders